is a railway station located in Kitakyūshū, Fukuoka.

Lines 
Chikuhō Electric Railroad
Chikuhō Electric Railroad Line

Platforms

Adjacent stations

Surrounding area
 Hokuchiku High School
 Yahatakōsei Hospital
 Takesue Elementary School
 Ichigo Nursery
 FamilyMart Yahataimaike

References

Railway stations in Fukuoka Prefecture
Railway stations in Japan opened in 1970